The 1993 Murphys Irish Professional Championship was a professional invitational snooker tournament, which took place between 16 and 20 May 1993 at Jury's Hotel in Cork, Republic of Ireland.

Ken Doherty won the title by beating Stephen Murphy 9–2 in the final.

Main draw

References

Irish Professional Championship
Irish Professional Championship
Irish Professional Championship
Irish Professional Championship